Didn't We is a studio album by American saxophonist Stan Getz, recorded in 1969 for Verve Records. It features Getz improvising jazz standards with a full orchestra conducted by Johnny Pate.

Track listing
"Didn't We" (Jimmy Webb) - 3:34
"The Shining Sea" (Johnny Mandel) - 3:13
"The Night Has a Thousand Eyes" (Bernier, Brainin) - 4:48
"Go Away, Little Girl" (Goffin, King) - 3:30
"Heartstrings" (Milt Jackson) - 5:52
"I Remember Clifford" (Golson) - 3:21
"Try to Understand" (Johnny Pate) - 2:38
"Emily" (Mandel, Mercer) - 3:39
"Mandy Is Two" (Fulton McGrath, Mercer) - 3:50
"What's New" (Haggart, Burke) - 4:11

Personnel
Stan Getz - tenor saxophone
Johnny Pate - arranger, conductor
Unidentified orchestra

References 

Verve Records albums
Stan Getz albums
1969 albums
Albums arranged by Johnny Pate
Albums produced by Johnny Pate